Radio Indochine is the second live album by French new wave band, Indochine, and eighth album overall. It was released on July 24, 1995.

Track listing
 Savoure le rouge - 5:26
 3 nuits par semaine - 6:05
 Canary Bay - 5:56
 Un jour dans notre vie - 6:22
 Tes yeux noirs - 4:53
 3e sexe - 3:46
 More - 5:51
 La machine à rattraper le temps - 3:47
 Des fleurs pour Salinger - 7:37
 Kao Bang - 3:59
 Bienvenue chez les nus - 4:13
 Les tzars - 5:12
 Crystal Song Telegram - 2:38
 L'aventurier - 6:53

References

External links
 Detailed album information at www.indo-chine.org

Indochine (band) albums
1995 live albums